The 2020–21 Youngstown State Penguins men's basketball team represented Youngstown State University in the 2020–21 NCAA Division I men's basketball season. The Penguins, led by fourth-year head coach Jerrod Calhoun, played their home games at the Beeghly Center in Youngstown, Ohio as members of the Horizon League.

Previous season
The Penguins finished the 2019–20 season 18–15, 10–8 in Horizon League play to finish in a tie for fourth place. They defeated Milwaukee in the first round of the Horizon League tournament before losing in the quarterfinals to UIC. They accepted and invitation to the CollegeIndsider.com Tournament. However, the CIT, and all other postseason tournaments, were cancelled amid the COVID-19 pandemic.

Roster

Schedule and results

|-
!colspan=12 style=| Non-conference regular season

|-
!colspan=9 style=| Horizon League regular season

|-
!colspan=12 style=| Horizon League tournament
|-

Source

References

Youngstown State Penguins men's basketball seasons
Youngstown State Penguins
Youngstown State Penguins men's basketball
Youngstown State Penguins men's basketball